Alan David Caughter (born 19 February 1946) is a Welsh footballer, who played as a full back in the Football League for Chester.

References

Chester City F.C. players
Bethesda Athletic F.C. players
Association football fullbacks
English Football League players
1946 births
Living people
Footballers from Bangor, Gwynedd
Welsh footballers